Fatai "Kid Dynamite" Onikeke (born 2 April 1983) is a Nigerian/Australian professional light welter/welterweight boxer of the 2000s and 2010s who won the Nigerian welterweight title, African Boxing Union (ABU) welterweight title, World Boxing Foundation (WBFo) Intercontinental light welterweight title, International Boxing Federation (IBF) Pan Pacific light welterweight title, and Commonwealth welterweight title, and was a challenger for the World Boxing Organization (WBO) Africa light welterweight title, WBFo light welterweight title, and World Boxing Organization (WBO) Oriental light welterweight title against Lance Gostelow , his professional fighting weight varied from , i.e. light welterweight to , i.e. welterweight.

Professional boxing record

Onikeke lost to Ganoy via 7th round TKO last 2006.

References

External links

Image - Fatai Onikeke 

1983 births
Light-welterweight boxers
Yoruba sportspeople
Boxers from Melbourne
Welterweight boxers
Living people
Nigerian male boxers